Chick is the surname of:

Austin Chick (born 1971), American film director, screenwriter and producer
Daniel Chick (born 1976), former Australian rules footballer
Gerald Chick, Australian-Canadian curler and coach
Harriette Chick (1875–1977), British nutritionist
Jack Chick (1924–2016), fundamentalist Christian American cartoonist and publisher and founder of Chick Publications
John Chick (born 1982), American football player
John Chick (footballer) (1932–2013), Australian rules footballer
Laura N. Chick (born 1944), American politician
Sandra Chick (born 1947), former field hockey player from Zimbabwe
Victoria Chick (born 1936), American economist

See also

Chica (name)
Chicky